Welfare Square is a complex in downtown Salt Lake City, Utah owned and operated by the Church of Jesus Christ of Latter-day Saints (LDS Church), to provide material assistance to poor and otherwise needy individuals and families. Welfare Square is part of the Church's Church Welfare System. It includes a  grain silo, fruit orchards, a milk-processing plant, a cannery, a bakery, a Deseret Industries thrift store, a private employment office, and the LDS Church's largest Bishop's storehouse, as well as associated administrative offices.

Most of the assistance provided at Welfare Square goes to those who are members of the LDS Church.

Welfare Square provides regular employment for approximately 50 people, in addition to the 200 rotating volunteers needed to provide its services and run its operations. Fast offerings from local LDS congregations fund its operations.

History
Welfare Square was created in 1938, under the direction of the  Church's General Welfare Committee, which itself had been formed just two years earlier. Throughout the 1930s and 1940s, as the United States was experiencing the Great Depression Welfare Square became the flagship of the Church's Welfare Program.

A four-year renovation started in the late 1990s, and was completed in 2001. The 1940 granary building was the only structure on the site that was not significantly refurbished or newly built at that time. The concrete grain elevator can hold  of wheat (about 19 million pounds).

In 2011 the Utah legislature passed, and the governor signed, a bill commemorating the founding of the LDS Church's Welfare System, of which Welfare Square is the centerpiece.

Values
As part of the LDS Church's larger Welfare Program, all aid received at Welfare Square is based on personal responsibility, thrift, and work; recipients of aid may be asked to volunteer their time after receiving help.

See also
 Beliefs and practices of The Church of Jesus Christ of Latter-day Saints: Welfare Program
 LDS Humanitarian Services

Notes

References
 
 
  (also: Fox News & Salt Lake Tribune)

Further reading

External links

 https://www.youtube.com/watch?v=lHOl9QwHsDc - YouTube

1938 establishments in Utah
Buildings and structures in Salt Lake City
Economy of Salt Lake City
Properties of the Church of Jesus Christ of Latter-day Saints
Significant places in Mormonism
Squares and plazas in Salt Lake City
The Church of Jesus Christ of Latter-day Saints in Utah
Tourist attractions in Salt Lake City